Statistics of Qatar Stars League for the 2001–02 season.

Overview
Nine teams competed for the championship, which was won by Al-Ittihad Doha.

League standings

References
Qatar - List of final tables (RSSSF)

qatar
1